Elections to the Massachusetts Senate were held during 1787 to elect 40 State Senators. Candidates were elected at the county level, with some counties electing multiple Senators.

For election, a candidate needed the support of a majority of those voting. If a seat remained vacant because no candidate received such majority, the Massachusetts General Court was empowered to fill it by a majority vote of its members.

The primary issue in this race was the ongoing ratification of the United States Constitution by a separate ratifying convention; the reaction divided the state (and nation) between Federalists and Anti-Federalists, though the factions did not appear as strictly formal political parties until 1789.

The elections were also held during the midst of Shays' Rebellion, an armed uprising in Western Massachusetts against the national government, formed in opposition to the ongoing debt crisis.

Apportionment

The apportionment of seats by population was as follows:
Barnstable County: 1
Berkshire County: 2
Bristol County: 3
Cumberland County: 1
Dukes and Nantucket Counties: 1
Essex County: 6
Hampshire County: 4
Lincoln County: 1
Middlesex County: 5
Plymouth County: 3
Suffolk County: 6
Worcester County: 5
York County: 2

Results

Barnstable

Berkshire

 

Both candidates were elected.

Bristol

Cumberland

Dukes and Nantucket

 
 
 

Because Mayhew failed to achieve a majority, the election was put to the General Court, which certified his election with near unanimity.

General Court

Essex

 
 
 
 
 
 
 
 
 

Dalton, Choate, and Greenleaf would subsequently be elected by the General Court.

General Court

Hampshire

 
 
 
 
 
 
 

Hastings, Smead, and Phelps were subsequently elected by the General Court.

General Court

Lincoln

Middlesex

 
 
 
 
 
 
 

Based on returns from Weston, Ezra Sergant, Abraham Fuller, James Prescot, Joseph Curtis, Thomas Fairweather, Joseph Roberts, John Brooks, and Abner Sanderson also received votes, but how many they received county-wide is unknown.

Hosmer and MacFarland were subsequently elected by the General Court.

General Court

Plymouth

 
 
 
 
 

Turner and Cushing were subsequently elected by the General Court.

General Court

Suffolk

 
 
 
 
 
 
 
 

Austin and Dunbar were subsequently elected by the General Court. (No result is listed for Dunbar's election.)

General Court

Worcester

General Court

York

 
 
 
 

No candidate received a majority. Cutts and Jordan were subsequently elected by the General Court.

General Court

References

Senate 1787
Massachusetts
Mass
Massachusetts Senate